The Little Wolf River of Wisconsin is a tributary of the Wolf River.

The Little Wolf River originates near Galloway in southeast Marathon County and flows into Waupaca County through Big Falls and Manawa and has a dam.  Below Manawa the Little Wolf River passes by Royalton then converges into the Wolf River in eastern Waupaca County.

References 

Rivers of Wisconsin
Rivers of Marathon County, Wisconsin
Bodies of water of Portage County, Wisconsin
Bodies of water of Waupaca County, Wisconsin